Oligochroides is a monotypic snout moth genus described by Embrik Strand in 1909. Its only species, Oligochroides nigritella, described in the same article, is found in South Africa.

References

Endemic moths of South Africa
Moths described in 1909
Phycitinae
Monotypic moth genera
Moths of Africa